Liliana Rodríguez Alejo (born 27 February 1996) is a Mexican professional football midfielder who currently plays for UNAM of the Liga MX Femenil.

Personal life
Rodríguez is openly lesbian. She is currently engaged to Atlético San Luis defender Maite García, who was her teammate at Toluca.

References

External links 
 

1996 births
Living people
Women's association football midfielders
Mexican women's footballers
Liga MX Femenil players
Deportivo Toluca F.C. (women) footballers
Club Universidad Nacional (women) footballers
Footballers from the State of Mexico
People from Toluca
Lesbian sportswomen
LGBT association football players
Mexican LGBT sportspeople
Mexican footballers